Krabi Provincial Stadium is a stadium in Krabi, Thailand.  It is currently used for football matches and is the home stadium of Krabi F.C. The stadium holds 8,000 spectators.

References

Football venues in Thailand
Buildings and structures in Krabi province
Krabi F.C.